Yalour Sound is a passage 1 mile (1.6 km) wide and 4 miles (6 km) long, usually ice bound, linking Fridtjof Sound and Antarctic Sound between Jonassen Island and Andersson Island, off Trinity Peninsula. Named by Argentina for Lieutenant Jorge Yalour, who accompanied the Uruguay relief expedition of 1903.

Sounds of Graham Land
Landforms of Trinity Peninsula